Berkshire School is a private, co-ed boarding school for grades 9 through 12 located in Sheffield, Massachusetts, USA.

History

1907–1943: Founding and early years

Berkshire School (for boys) was established in 1907 at the foot of Mount Everett, one of the highest mountains in Massachusetts, by Seaver Burton Buck, a Harvard graduate who had previously taught at Hackley School.  Buck led the school until 1943.  His educational philosophy is reported as a "Victorian disciplinarian [who] was sometimes subverted by a pixieish manner." It is also reported that during this period the school "lacked the prestige of top-drawer prep schools." Despite this fact, when Albert Keep became headmaster in 1943, the school instituted an Education with Wings program, which enabled students to gain a high school diploma and simultaneously prepare for World War II.

1943–1970: Rapid growth
In 1943, Delano de Windt, a 1911 graduate of the school, became headmaster. He was soon followed by John E. Godman in 1951, who increased the school's enrollment to 330 boys and expanded the faculty to 35 teachers. In 1964, an arts and science wing was added to Berkshire Hall. In 1969, Berkshire also enrolled nine girls as day students in what Godman described as "an experiment" in coeducation. This led to full-scale coeducation.

1971–1987: Changes

At the beginning of the 1970s, Robert Minnerly took over as headmaster. Under his leadership, the school restructured its scholastic mission and added new programs in computer science, ethics, health, and environmental science. His successors built on these changes and added new programs of their own. Under James Moore (1979 - 1987), Berkshire constructed a 35,000 square foot athletic center and renovated the gymnasium to house a modern library which today boasts 40,000 volumes.

1988–2003: Dilemmas of a new decade
In 1991, Richard Unsworth whose previous experience included being the headmaster at Northfield Mount Hermon School became headmaster. During Unsworth headmastership the school introduced co-curricular programs in Chinese and outdoor education though the school's "reputation for being lax about drugs" remained an issue.

Whilst Unsworth incorporated drug-awareness and counseling programs after a series of drug-related incidents he resigned his post. The board of trustees turned to Paul Christopher (1996 - 2002), an ethicist and previous head of philosophy at West Point, New York, as the next headmaster to address the renewed public embarrassment around drugs. Drug and alcohol use "declined dramatically" under Christopher. In June 2002 Christopher resigned as headmaster "amidst sexual harassment allegations."

A year later, the board of trustees turned to Larry Piatelli (2003), a Harvard graduate, to reverse the school's decline. The Harvard Crimson described Piatelli as a "strong leader" and noted that Piatelli "caused two administrators and two faculty members to follow him to the Berkshire school from their former positions at Albany Academy."

After being headmaster for only three and a half months, Piatelli died of a heart attack while playing hockey in Albany, New York, on October 19, 2003. Hawley Rogers, a Berkshire graduate, served as interim headmaster for six months.

2004–present: The Berkshire resurgence
Michael J. Maher became head of school in 2004. During his tenure the school's admissions applications doubled and the endowment rose to upwards of $110 million. The 2011 acceptance rate was 24%.

In 2008, the school's main academic building was reopened after undergoing renovations. A year later, the Jackman L. Stewart Athletic Center was also completed. In 2011, Berkshire added a new music center and renovated its performing arts facilities.

Maher resigned abruptly on April 22, 2013. He was replaced by the school's former dean of academic affairs Pieter Mulder.

Sustainability
The school is reported as becoming 'green'.

 In 2008, Berkshire won the Green Cup Challenge for reducing the school's energy output by 21.05%.

Interscholastic sports

The school offers 33 athletics.

Berkshire's athletic teams compete with boarding schools and other private schools throughout New England, including Cushing Academy, Choate Rosemary Hall, Loomis Chaffee, Suffield Academy, Kent School, Pomfret School, South Kent School, The Gunnery, Tabor Academy, Taft School, Salisbury School, Millbrook School, Deerfield Academy, Albany Academy, Canterbury School, Brunswick School, Williston Northampton School, Trinity Pawling, Hotchkiss School, Avon Old Farms,  Northfield Mount Hermon, and Forman School.

Campus

In a 2002 article the Boston Globe reported: "At the foot of Mount Everett, on a serene stretch of woods and fields in an isolated corner of southwestern Massachusetts, sits the Berkshire School. Drive along Undermountain Road in Sheffield, turn up a maple-lined lane and over a little rocky bridge, and there it is: the heart of what must be one of the prettiest campuses in Massachusetts, or anywhere."

The school's buildings are reported as "tastefully proportioned ivy-covered buildings [that] flank manicured lawns. Rustic gray buildings tucked behind leafy copses house almost all of the 64 faculty members. Acres of pristine forest laced with trails rise behind the school."

Up the mountain is Guilder Pond, the highest fresh water pond in the state.

Campus facilities

Academic facilities

 The Morgan/Bellas/Dixon Math and Science Center is the school's 48,000-square-foot dedicated in 2012 housing math, science classroom/laboratories, and a teaching auditorium.
 The Fine Arts Center opened 2014 in Berkshire Hall at 14,700-square-foot.
 The Dixon Observatory which opened in 2000, houses state-of-the-art equipment that gives students and teachers the opportunity to make detailed observations of both solar system bodies as well as deep space objects. In addition, the tracking mount and CCD camera allows students to conduct advanced astro-imaging of faint galaxies and nebulae.

Governing structure
In the 1980s the school's board of trustees numbered 30.

Notable alumni

Artists, poets, and writers
Stirling Dickinson - expatriate artist 
William Matthews -  poet and essayist
George Platt Lynes -  fashion and commercial photographer
C. D. B. Bryan - author and journalist
Lincoln Kirstein - co-founder of the New York City Ballet
Michael Gutenplan - magician and mentalist
J. P. Davis - screenwriter and actor
E.V. Day - sculptor and installation artist
Kristin Baker - painter

Finance
Peter Kellogg - former CEO of Wall Street specialist firm Spear, Leeds & Kellogg

Industrialists
Harry Gale Nye, Jr. - industrialist, entrepreneur, and world champion sailor
John Hugh MacMillan - businessman

Media
Calvin Tomkins - author and art critic for The New Yorker magazine
Ryan Lizza - CNN contributor and the Washington correspondent for Esquire magazine
Chester Currier - newspaper and magazine columnist and nonfiction book author
Ryan Brandell - Blogger "Barstool Chief" of Barstool Sports Chicago. Co-host of Redline Radio Podcast and Sirus XM Barstool Chicago Radio.

Politics
Wynn Underwood - Former Associate Justice of the Vermont Supreme Court and former member of the Vermont House of Representatives

Scientists
William Standish Knowles - Nobel laureate in chemistry
Oliver L. Austin - ornithologist and zoologist

Sports
Conal Groom - Olympian in rowing
Jeff McLaughlin - Olympian in rowing
Kacey Bellamy - ice hockey defenseman
Kendall Coyne - ice hockey forward
Matt Sewell - Canadian football player
Kevan Miller - ice hockey defenseman
Zeiko Lewis - Bermudan soccer player
Jack Harrison - English soccer player
Kevin Rooney - ice hockey forward
Justin Donawa - Bermudan soccer player
Rebecca Russo - ice hockey forward
Jacob Shaffelburg - Canadian soccer player, Toronto FC (MLS)
Joseph Lin - Chinese American professional basketball player

References

External links

 Boarding School Review
 Admissions Quest
 The Association of Boarding Schools

Private high schools in Massachusetts
Boarding schools in Massachusetts
Educational institutions established in 1907
Schools in Berkshire County, Massachusetts
1907 establishments in Massachusetts